Jovian (April 5, 1994 – November 10, 2014) was a Coquerel's sifaka lemur, best known for portraying the title character in the children's television series Zoboomafoo.

Biography
Jovian was born on April 5, 1994, at the Duke Lemur Center in Durham, North Carolina, to parents Nigel and Flavia. Jovian sometimes shared the title role with his father.

When Martin Kratt and his younger brother Chris wanted a lemur co-host for their TV show Zoboomafoo, Martin returned to the Duke Lemur Center, where he had previously volunteered while a student at Duke University. In 1997, the Kratts prepared for the show by filming Jovian and his parents jumping around an outdoor cage modeled on the stage set. Jovian appeared on the program from January 1999 to June 2001. Jovian would appear mostly in the opening segments, before transforming into a talking lemur puppet after eating his meals.

Zoboomafoo's voice was provided by veteran Canadian puppeteer Gord Robertson.

After appearing on the show, Jovian was credited with attracting 15,000 visitors to the Duke Lemur Center each year. As part of the center's conservation breeding program, Jovian was paired with a lemur named Pia. Throughout his life, Jovian sired 13 offspring with two different breeding partners. 

On November 10th, 2014, Jovian died at the Duke Lemur Center at the age of 20. News of his death spread quickly worldwide, with an outpouring of grief from the public and media industry. The first relative of Jovian to be born after his death was his granddaughter Isabella, born on January 25, 2015. Since then, his children have produced multiple children. On June 15, 2021, the Kratt Brothers' official TikTok account uploaded a video showing Jovian's new granddaughter Cassia, born from his daughter Gisela.

Filmography
(Zoboomafoo) 1999

References

External links
 Official obituary
 Official video tribute

1994 animal births
2014 animal deaths
Animal actors
Deaths from kidney failure
Individual primates in the United States
Individual primates